Joseph Waterhouse may refer to:

 Joey Waterhouse (born 1987), English footballer
 Joseph Waterhouse (minister) (1828–1881), Australian Methodist minister and missionary in Fiji